André Isaac (15 August 1893 Châlons-sur-Marne, France – 9 February 1975 Paris, France), better known as Pierre Dac, was a French humorist. During World War II, Pierre Dac was one of the speakers of the BBC's Radio Londres service to occupied France. He produced a series of satirical songs which were broadcast on the station. After the war, he participated in a comic duet with the humorist Francis Blanche.

A very active freemason, initiated in 1926 at "Les Inséparables d'Osiris" lodge in Paris, he created a parodic and slang masonic rite "Le rite des Voyous" still practiced in some French lodges.

Dac is also the creator of the comic term "Schmilblick."

Filmography 
 Radio Surprises (1940)
 Good Enough to Eat (1951)
 La Famille Anodin (1956) (TV)
 La Belle Américaine (1961)
 Ne jouez pas avec les Martiens (1968)
 Le Petit Baigneur (1968)

References

People from Châlons-en-Champagne
1893 births
1975 deaths
French humorists
French chansonniers
French male writers
French Freemasons
Recipients of the Resistance Medal
Recipients of the Croix de Guerre 1914–1918 (France)
Recipients of the Croix de Guerre 1939–1945 (France)
Chevaliers of the Légion d'honneur
Burials at Père Lachaise Cemetery
20th-century French male singers
20th-century French male writers